Athrips nitrariella is a moth of the family Gelechiidae. It is found in Algeria.

The wingspan is about 12 mm. The forewings are greyish white, with the white scales mainly along the costal margin. The grey scales form diffuse dark spots at one-third and two-thirds of the costa and there are two very small spots of raised brown scales at two-thirds. The hindwings are light grey. Adults are on wing in September and from February to May.

The larvae feed on Nitraria tridentata.

References

Moths described in 1908
Athrips
Moths of Africa